Charles Laurens Querrie (July 25, 1877 – April 5, 1950) was the first General Manager of the Toronto Maple Leafs, at the time called the Toronto Arenas (1917–20) and the Toronto St. Patricks (1920–27).

Querrie was born in Markham, Ontario around the area now known as Victoria Square.

Career
Querrie won two Stanley Cups with the team, in 1917–18 and again in 1921–22. Prior to his career in hockey coaching and management, Querrie was a prominent lacrosse player in amateur and professional leagues in his hometown of Markham (member of Lacrosse Hall of Fame) as well as in Toronto.

In 1927 Querrie sold his majority stake of the St. Pat's to Conn Smythe, who had purchased the team along with several partners including St. Pat's minority owner Jack Bickell.

He was inducted into the Canadian Lacrosse Hall of Fame as a field player in 1965, the first year of inductees.

Later Years
He died on April 5, 1950 at Toronto General Hospital of a heart attack.

Coaching record

References

1877 births
1950 deaths
Canadian lacrosse players
Ice hockey people from Ontario
National Hockey League executives
National Hockey League general managers
National Hockey League owners
People from Markham, Ontario
Stanley Cup champions
Toronto Maple Leafs executives
Maple Leaf Sports & Entertainment